Brandon Aubrey (born March 14, 1995) is an American soccer player who plays as a defender. He currently plays American football as a placekicker for the Birmingham Stallions of the United States Football League (USFL).

Career

College
Aubrey played four years of college soccer at the University of Notre Dame between 2013 and 2016, where in 2016 Aubrey was named NSCAA Third Team All-American, NSCAA First Team All-South Region, First Team All-ACC, and  NSCAA Academic All-American.

Professional
Aubrey was selected in the first round (21st overall) of the 2017 MLS SuperDraft by Toronto FC.

Aubrey made his professional debut on March 25, 2017, starting for Toronto's United Soccer League affiliate team against Phoenix Rising FC.

Aubrey was released by Toronto at the end of their 2017 season, and subsequently signed with United Soccer League club Bethlehem Steel on January 10, 2018. Bethlehem Steel released Aubrey at the end of the 2018 season.

Switch to gridiron football
Aubrey was drafted as a placekicker by the Birmingham Stallions in the 2022 USFL Draft and made his debut as a professional American football player on April 16, 2022.

Personal life
According to Aubrey's Instagram account, he was married to Jenn Aubrey on December 31, 2018.

References

External links
 
 
 
 Notre Dame bio

1995 births
Living people
American soccer players
Notre Dame Fighting Irish men's soccer players
Toronto FC players
Toronto FC II players
Philadelphia Union II players
Expatriate soccer players in Canada
USL Championship players
Toronto FC draft picks
Soccer players from Texas
Sportspeople from Plano, Texas
Association football defenders
Birmingham Stallions (2022) players
Footballers who switched code
American football placekickers